Nevile is a surname and given name. Notable people with the name include:

Given name:
Nevile Bland KCMG KCVO (1886–1972), British diplomat, Envoy Extraordinary and Minister Plenipotentiary to the Netherlands during WWII
Nevile Butler KCMG CVO (1893–1973), British diplomat
Thomas Nevile Carter (1851–1879), English amateur sportsman who played football for England
Nevile Davidson, DL, ChStJ (1899–1976), senior Church of Scotland minister
Nevile Gwynne, British writer who wrote the book Gwynne's Grammar
Nevile Henderson GCMG (1882–1942), British diplomat, ambassador of the United Kingdom to Germany from 1937 to 1939
Peter Nevile Wake Jennings, CVO (born 1934), British public servant, Serjeant-at-Arms of the House of Commons
Nevile Lodge OBE (1918–1989), New Zealand cartoonist
Nevile Lubbock KCMG (1839–1914), President of the West India Committee and an English amateur cricketer
Nevile Wilkinson, KCVO (1869–1940), British officer of arms, British Army officer, author and a dolls house designer

Surname:
Bernard Nevile (1888–1916), English first-class cricketer
Christopher Nevile (1631–1692), English Member of Parliament
Henry Nevile (Lord Lieutenant of Lincolnshire), KCVO, KStJ, JP, DL (1920–1996), English farmer, Lord Lieutenant of Lincolnshire
Liddy Nevile (born 1947), Australian academic and a pioneer in using computers for education in Australia
Mildred Nevile MBE (1927–2012), lifelong Catholic activist against poverty and injustice
Pran Nevile (1922–2018), Indian author of books including Lahore: A Sentimental Journey
Thomas Nevile (died 1615), English clergyman and academic, Dean of Canterbury (1597–1615), Master of Trinity College, Cambridge (1593–1615)

See also
Nevil (disambiguation)
Nevill (disambiguation)
Neville (disambiguation)
Néville